BGP hijacking (sometimes referred to as prefix hijacking, route hijacking or IP hijacking) is the illegitimate takeover of groups of IP addresses by corrupting Internet routing tables maintained using the Border Gateway Protocol (BGP).

Background 
The Internet is a global network in enabling any connected host, identified by its unique IP address, to talk to any other, anywhere in the world.  This is achieved by passing data from one router to another, repeatedly moving each packet closer to its destination, until it is hopefully delivered.  To do this, each router must be regularly supplied with up-to-date routing tables.  At the global level, individual IP addresses are grouped together into prefixes.  These prefixes will be originated, or owned, by an autonomous system (AS) and the routing tables between ASes are maintained using the Border Gateway Protocol (BGP).

A group of networks that operate under a single external routing policy is known as an autonomous system.  For example, Sprint, Verizon, and AT&T each are an AS.  Each AS has its own unique AS identifier number. BGP is the standard routing protocol used to exchange information about IP routing between autonomous systems.

Each AS uses BGP to advertise prefixes that it can deliver traffic to.

Although security extensions are available for BGP, and third-party route DB resources exist for validating routes, by default the BGP protocol is designed to trust all route announcements sent by peers, and few ISPs rigorously enforce checks on BGP sessions.

Mechanism 
IP hijacking can occur deliberately or by accident in one of several ways:
 An AS announces that it originates a prefix that it does not actually originate.
 An AS announces a more specific prefix than what may be announced by the true originating AS.
 An AS announces that it can route traffic to the hijacked AS through a shorter route than is already available, regardless of whether or not the route actually exists.

Common to these ways is their disruption of the normal routing of the network: packets end up being forwarded towards the wrong part of the network and then either enter an endless loop (and are discarded), or are found at the mercy of the offending AS.

Typically ISPs filter BGP traffic, allowing BGP advertisements from their downstream networks to contain only valid IP space.  However, a history of hijacking incidents shows this is not always the case.

The Resource Public Key Infrastructure (RPKI) is designed to authenticate route origins via cryptographic certificate chains demonstrating address block range ownership, but is not widely deployed yet.  Once deployed, IP hijacking through errant issues at the origin (via both accident or intent) should be detectable and filterable.

IP hijacking is sometimes used by malicious users to obtain IP addresses for use in spamming or a distributed denial-of-service (DDoS) attack.

When a router promulgates flawed BGP routing information, whether that action is intentional or accidental, it is defined by the Internet Engineering Task Force (IETF) in RFC 7908 as a "route leak". Such leaks are described as "the propagation of routing announcement(s) beyond their intended scope. That is, an announcement from an Autonomous System (AS) of a learned BGP route to another AS is in violation of the intended policies of the receiver, the sender, and/or one of the ASes along the preceding AS path." Such leaks are possible because of a long-standing "…systemic vulnerability of the Border Gateway Protocol routing system…"

BGP hijacking and transit-AS problems
Like the TCP reset attack, session hijacking involves intrusion into an ongoing BGP session, i.e., the attacker successfully masquerades as one of the peers in a BGP session, and requires the same information needed to accomplish the reset attack. The difference is that a session hijacking attack may be designed to achieve more than simply bringing down a session between BGP peers. For example, the objective may be to change routes used by the peer, in order to facilitate eavesdropping, black holing, or traffic analysis.

By default EBGP peers will attempt to add all routes received by another peer into the device's routing table and will then attempt to advertise nearly all of these routes to other EBGP peers.  This can be a problem as multi-homed organizations can inadvertently advertise prefixes learned from one AS to another, causing the end customer to become the new, best-path to the prefixes in question.  For example, a customer with a Cisco router peering with say AT&T and Verizon and using no filtering will automatically attempt to link the two major carriers, which could cause the providers to prefer sending some or all traffic through the customer (on perhaps a T1), instead of using high-speed dedicated links.  This problem can further affect others that peer with these two providers and also cause those ASs to prefer the misconfigured link.  In reality, this problem hardly ever occurs with large ISPs, as these ISPs tend to restrict what an end customer can advertise.  However,  any ISP not filtering customer advertisements can allow errant information to be advertised into the global routing table where it can affect even the large Tier-1 providers.

The concept of BGP hijacking revolves around locating an ISP that is not filtering advertisements (intentionally or otherwise) or locating an ISP whose internal or ISP-to-ISP BGP session is susceptible to a man-in-the-middle attack.  Once located, an attacker can potentially advertise any prefix they want, causing some or all traffic to be diverted from the real source towards the attacker.  This can be done either to overload the ISP the attacker has infiltrated, or to perform a DoS or impersonation attack on the entity whose prefix is being advertised.  It is not uncommon for an attacker to cause serious outages, up to and including a complete loss of connectivity.  In early 2008, at least eight US Universities had their traffic diverted to Indonesia for about 90 minutes one morning in an attack kept mostly quiet by those involved.  Also, in February 2008, a large portion of YouTube's address space was redirected to Pakistan when the PTA decided to block access to the site from inside the country, but accidentally blackholed the route in the global BGP table.

While filtering and MD5/TTL protection is already available for most BGP implementations (thus preventing the source of most attacks), the problem stems from the concept that ISPs rarely ever filter advertisements from other ISPs, as there is no common or efficient way to determine the list of permissible prefixes each AS can originate.  The penalty for allowing errant information to be advertised can range from simple filtering by other/larger ISPs to a complete shutdown of the BGP session by the neighboring ISP (causing the two ISPs to cease peering), and repeated problems often end in permanent termination of all peering agreements.  It is also noteworthy that even causing a major provider to block or shutdown a smaller, problematic provider, the global BGP table will often reconfigure and reroute the traffic through other available routes until all peers take action, or until the errant ISP fixes the problem at the source.

One useful offshoot of this concept is called BGP anycasting and is frequently used by root DNS servers to allow multiple servers to use the same IP address, providing redundancy and a layer of protection against DoS attacks without publishing hundreds of server IP addresses.  The difference in this situation is that each point advertising a prefix actually has access to the real data (DNS in this case) and responds correctly to end user requests.

Public incidents
 April 1997:  The "AS 7007 incident"
 December 24, 2004: TTNet in Turkey hijacks the Internet
 May 7, 2005: Google's May 2005 Outage
 January 22, 2006: Con Edison Communications hijacks big chunk of the Internet
 February 24, 2008: Pakistan's attempt to block YouTube access within their country takes down YouTube entirely.
 November 11, 2008: The Brazilian ISP CTBC - Companhia de Telecomunicações do Brasil Central leaked their internal table into the global BGP table. It lasted over 5 minutes. Although, it was detected by a RIPE route server and then it was not propagated, affecting practically only their own ISP customers and few others.
 April 8, 2010: Chinese ISP hijacks the Internet
 July 2013: The Hacking Team aided Raggruppamento Operativo Speciale (ROS - Special Operations Group of the Italian National Military police) in regaining access to Remote Access Tool (RAT) clients after they abruptly lost access to one of their control servers when the Santrex IPv4 prefix 46.166.163.0/24 became permanently unreachable. ROS and the Hacking Team worked with the Italian network operator Aruba S.p.A. (AS31034) to get the prefix announced in BGP in order to regain access to the control server.
 February, 2014: Canadian ISP used to redirect data from ISPs. - In 22 incidents between February and May a hacker redirected traffic for roughly 30 seconds each session. Bitcoin and other crypto-currency mining operations were targeted and currency was stolen.
 January 2017: Iranian pornography censorship.
 April 2017: Russian telecommunication company Rostelecom (AS12389) originated 37 prefixes for numerous other Autonomous Systems. The hijacked prefixes belonged to financial institutions (most notably MasterCard and Visa), other telecom companies, and a variety of other organizations. Even though the possible hijacking lasted no more than 7 minutes it is still not clear if the traffic got intercepted or modified.
 December 2017: Eighty high-traffic prefixes normally announced by Google, Apple, Facebook, Microsoft, Twitch, NTT Communications, Riot Games, and others, were announced by a Russian AS, DV-LINK-AS (AS39523).
 April 2018: Roughly 1300 IP addresses within Amazon Web Services space, dedicated to Amazon Route 53, were hijacked by eNet (or a customer thereof), an ISP in Columbus, Ohio.  Several peering partners, such as Hurricane Electric, blindly propagated the announcements.
 July 2018: Iran Telecommunication Company (AS58224) originated 10 prefixes of Telegram Messenger.
November 2018: US-based China Telecom site originated Google addresses.
May 2019: Traffic to a public DNS run by Taiwan Network Information Center (TWNIC) was rerouted to an entity in Brazil (AS268869).
June 2019: Large European mobile traffic was rerouted through China Telecom (AS4134) "This route leak began when [Swiss] SafeHost (AS21217) announced more than forty-thousand IPv4 routes that had been learned from other peers and providers to its provider China Telecom (AS 4134). …In turn, China Telecom accepted these routes and propagated them…"
February 2021: Initially reported that Cablevision Mexico (AS28548) leaked 282 prefixes creating conflicts for 763 ASNs in 80 countries, with the main impact in Mexico. Data from the Isolario MRT dump suggested that 7,200 IPv4 prefixes were announced and leaked to AS1874 impacting more than 1290 ASNs from over 100 countries.
April 2021: Large BGP routing leak out of India: over 30,000 BGP prefixes hijacked via Vodafone Idea Ltd (AS55410) causing 13X spike in inbound traffic. Prefixes were from around the globe but mostly US including Google, Microsoft, Akamai, and Cloudflare.
February 2022: Attackers hijacked BGP prefixes that belonged to a South Korean cryptocurrency platform, and then issued a certificate on the domain via ZeroSSL to serve a malicious JavaScript file, stealing $1.9 million worth of cryptocurrency.
March 2022: RTComm hijacked a prefix used by Twitter.

See also
 Bogon filtering
 Border Gateway Protocol
 Resource Public Key Infrastructure
Internet outage

References

External links
Qrator.Radar: A real-time BGP connectivity and security monitoring system.
 BGPmon.net:  A BGP specific monitoring system to detect prefix hijacks, route leakage and instability.
 Cyclops:  A BGP network audit tool (prefix hijack, route leakage) by UCLA
 NetViews: A Real Time BGP Topology visualization and IP Hijacking Detection tool by University of Memphis.
 AS-CRED: A service of reputation-based trust management and real-time alert (prefix hijacking, unstable prefix announcement), for inter-domain routing by University of Pennsylvania.
Is BGP safe yet?: List of ISPs that implement Resource Public Key Infrastructure (RPKI).

Internet security
Routing